The Linen Hall Library is located at 17 Donegall Square North, Belfast, Northern Ireland. It is the oldest library in Belfast and the last subscribing library in Northern Ireland. The Library is physically in the centre of Belfast, and more generally at the centre of the cultural and creative life of the wider community. It is an independent and charitable body.

History

Early history

The Linen Hall Library is a unique institution. It was founded in 1788 by a group of artisans as the Belfast Reading Society and in 1792 became the Belfast Society for Promoting Knowledge. It adopted a resolution in 1795 "that the object of this Society is the collection of an extensive Library, philosophical apparatus and such products of nature and art as tend to improve the mind and excite a spirit of general enquiry".

It began to acquire books (with a particular focus on those relating to Irish topics, publishing, for example Ancient Irish Music by Edward Bunting in 1796) and also other items which could be used to advance knowledge. The society declined in the later 1790s however, as it owned no permanent premises and struggled with official attempts to control radical thought, though it survived a crackdown after the 1798 rebellion thanks to the efforts of Rev. William Bruce.

In 1802 the Library moved into permanent premises in White Linen Hall (from which it took its name, though legally it is still the Belfast Society for Promoting Knowledge). The Library struggled, however, through most of the 19th century. It became more conservative, attempting to exclude students from Queen's College and debating whether or not to include fiction.

As the Library's centenary approached it was hit by another setback as it lost its premises in White Linen Hall to make way for the construction of the new City Hall. The Library moved into a warehouse in Donegall Square (previously used for linen), which was designed by Charles Lanyon and his firm, and which the Library occupies as of 2009. At the same time it made the transition from being a private company to one with public duties with regard to care for its collections. This was also a period when the Library became much more ambitious, collecting books with a new vigour and implementing many cultural programmes.

In the Interwar period the Library's success continued as the public library system was slow to develop and even after World War II it was a hub of creativity in Northern Ireland. It failed to secure this position, though and in the years following began to decline. Investment in public libraries combined with extensive IRA bombing in the city centre led to membership levels falling. By the end of the 1970s the Library was on the brink of closure, with large amounts of material (including an extensive collection relating to The Troubles) but a poor building, few users and serious money problems. In response, the Department of Education threatened to withdraw its grant and in 1980 proposals were made to close the Library permanently.

Later history

After 1980 a fight began to save the library. It was decided that it should begin to allow and encourage free public reference access and to concentrate particularly on Irish studies, politics and culture, both because it was already strong in these areas and so as not to compete with the expanded Central Reference Library. The move was a success. The number of subscribers began to increase and the library increased its role as a cultural centre, both facilitating research and fostering close links with the wider community.

It quickly became apparent that lack of space was holding back the library's revival. After spending ten years exploring various options, a decision was made to purchase a 999-year lease on the upper floors of some neighbouring property in 1996. This was followed by an extensive fundraising campaign to pay for the development of this new property. Construction began in 1999 and was completed in time for the opening on 16 September 2000.

On 27 October 2016 Linen Hall Board President Anne Davies and Director Julie Andrews had the honor of welcoming President of Ireland, Michael D. Higgins for his first visit to the library. A poet himself, Higgins was particularly interested in resources pertaining to local poet Sir Samuel Ferguson. A choir consisting of students from Holy Cross Boys' Primary School and Campbell College performed for the guests of the notable event.

Holdings
In addition to providing a free public reference service and a general lending service for both adults and children the Library also houses several special collections. It is the leading centre for "Irish and Local Studies" in Northern Ireland which includes its comprehensive stock of "Early Belfast and Ulster printed books", periodicals and newspapers dating back as far as 1738 and a wide variety of archive and manuscript material. It also contains an extensive collection of maps (some of great historical interest) and extensive materials in the Irish language. Its "Northern Ireland Political Collection" collected since 1968 contains 250,000 items and is the definitive archive of the recent troubles, containing material looking at all sides of the conflict. It also houses collections devoted to genealogy, the poet Robert Burns and Northern Irish performing art.

Since there is no national library for Northern Ireland, the Linen Hall Library is collecting all books and journals published in Northern Ireland in the 21st century to create NIPR, the National Collection of Northern Ireland Publications (originally the Northern Ireland Publication Resource). The collection is split between the Linen Hall Library and Belfast Central Library.

References

External links 

 Linen Hall Library

Buildings and structures in Belfast
Education in Belfast
Christopher Ewart-Biggs Memorial Prize recipients
Libraries in Northern Ireland
Subscribing libraries in the United Kingdom
Archives in Northern Ireland
History museums in Northern Ireland
Grade B1 listed buildings
Tourist attractions in Belfast
1788 establishments in Ireland